The 1997 Benson & Hedges Cup was the twenty-sixth edition of cricket's Benson & Hedges Cup. It was an English limited overs county cricket tournament which was held between 28 April and 12 July 1997.

The competition was won by Surrey County Cricket Club for the second time, defeating Kent County Cricket Club by 8 wickets in the final at Lord's on 12 July 1997.

Fixtures and results

Group stage

Group A

Source:

Group B

Source:

Group C

Source:

Group D

Source:

Quarter-finals

Semi-finals

Final

References

See also
Benson & Hedges Cup

Benson & Hedges Cup seasons
1997 in English cricket